WBBV (101.3 FM, "River 101.3") is a radio station broadcasting a country music format. Licensed to Vicksburg, Mississippi, United States, the station is currently owned by Robert H. Holladay, through licensee Holladay Broadcasting of Louisiana, L.L.C., and features programming from Dial Global.

References

External links
 
 

Country radio stations in the United States
BBV
Radio stations established in 1999
1999 establishments in Mississippi